Accardo is an Italian surname. Notable people with the surname include:

 Jeremy Accardo (born 1981), American bullpen coach and former baseball player
 Salvatore Accardo (born 1941), Italian violin virtuoso and conductor
 Tony Accardo (1906–1992), Italian-American mobster

References 

Italian-language surnames